Ramavatar Shastri (June 1920 – 26 January 1988) was an Indian politician. He was elected to the Lok Sabha, the lower house of the Parliament of India from the Patna in Bihar as a member of the Communist Party of India.

References

External links
Official biographical sketch in Parliament of India website

1920 births
1988 deaths
Communist Party of India politicians from Bihar
India MPs 1967–1970
India MPs 1971–1977
India MPs 1980–1984
Lok Sabha members from Bihar